Al Matthews or Al Mathews may refer to:

 Al Matthews (actor) (1942-2018), British-based U.S. actor
 Al Matthews (American football) (born 1947)
Al Matthews, political candidate for Northumberland (Ontario electoral district)
Al Mathews, investigator in 2011 Canadian federal election voter suppression scandal
Al Matthews on WDBY

See also 
 Albert Matthews (disambiguation)
 Alfred Matthews (disambiguation)
 Alan Matthews (disambiguation)